Angela Smith is a women's rights activist from Gibraltar, who co-founded the Gibraltar Women's Association (GWA) with Mariola Summerfield. She was chair of the association from 1966 to 1969. In 1966 she organised a petition, signed by 96% of the women's electorate, designed to demonstrate to the British government that Gibraltar wished to remain British. The same year, when General Franco banned Spanish women from crossing the border to work in Gibraltar, Smith was instrumental in establishing a Gibraltarian women's workforce. In 2016, at the fiftieth anniversary celebrations of the GWA, a letter from Smith was read out by her daughter.

References

External links 

 Sisters are doing it for themselves: 50 years of girl power celebrated in Gibraltar

Year of birth missing (living people)
Gibraltarian women in politics
Women's rights activists